First-seeded and defending champion Darlene Hard defeated sixth-seeded Ann Haydon 6–3, 6–4 in the final to win the women's singles tennis title at the 1961 U.S. National Championships.

Seeds
The seeded players are listed below. Darlene Hard is the champion; others show in brackets the round in which they were eliminated.

  Darlene Hard (champion)
  Angela Mortimer (semifinals)
  Karen Hantze (third round)
  Christine Truman (quarterfinals)
  Margaret Smith (semifinals)
  Ann Haydon (finalist)
  Lesley Turner (quarterfinals)
  Yola Ramírez (quarterfinals)

Draw

Key
 Q = Qualifier
 WC = Wild card
 LL = Lucky loser
 r = Retired

Final eight

References

1961
1961 in women's tennis
1961 in American women's sports
Wom